Rhythms del Mundo: Classics is the follow-up album to the internationally successful album Rhythms del Mundo, released in 2009, with the Buena Vista Social Club appearing with artists including the Killers, Amy Winehouse, Keane, Jack Johnson, the Rolling Stones, KT Tunstall and Rodrigo y Gabriela.

Charity
Proceeds from the album benefited the environmental non-profit organization Artists Project Earth, which raises awareness and funds for climate change projects and for disaster relief efforts. The artists on this album fully support the record as a commitment to the music and to the cause that it endorses.

Track listing
All tracks by RDM, featured performers listed below.

"Hotel California" – The Killers
"Cupid" – Amy Winehouse
"Imagine" – Jack Johnson
"Under Pressure" – Keane
"Walk on the Wild Side" – Editors
"I Heard It Through The Grapevine" – Kaiser Chiefs
"(I Can't Get No) Satisfaction" – Cat Power
"Under the Boardwalk" – The Rolling Stones
"Runaway" – The Zutons
"Because the Night" – KT Tunstall
"Bohemian Rhapsody" – Augusto Enriquez
"For What It's Worth" – OneRepublic
"Big Yellow Taxi" – Aquila Rose and Idana Valdes
"Beat It" – Fall Out Boy and John Mayer
"Purple Haze" – RDM
"Smells Like Teen Spirit" – Shanade
"Are You Ready for Love" – The Kooks
"Mi Cherie Amour" – Eros Ramazzotti
"Stairway to Heaven" – Rodrigo y Gabriela

Charts

References

External links
 http://www.rhythmsdelmundo.com/classics
 http://www.rhythmsdelmundo.com
 https://web.archive.org/web/20190523052838/http://rhythmsdelmundorevival.com/

Covers albums
Dance music albums by Cuban artists
Buena Vista Social Club
Salsa compilation albums
2009 compilation albums
Mambo compilation albums
Son cubano compilation albums
Bolero compilation albums
Universal Music Group compilation albums
Spanish-language compilation albums
Compilation albums by Cuban artists